Silvester Goraseb (born 7 September 1974) is a retired Namibian footballer. He competed for the Namibia national football team from 1996 to 2001, including the 1998 African Cup of Nations.

References

1974 births
Living people
Namibia international footballers
Namibian men's footballers
1998 African Cup of Nations players
Black Africa S.C. players
Association footballers not categorized by position